Floridsdorf (Central Bavarian: Fluridsduaf) is the 21st district of Vienna, located in the northern part of the city and comprising seven formerly independent communities: Floridsdorf, Donaufeld, Greater Jedlersdorf, Jedlesee, Leopoldau, Stammersdorf, and Strebersdorf.

History

Prehistory
Settlements were already present during the New Stone Age (4000 to 2000 BC). Stone axes and potsherds unearthed from that time indicate that the first settlers in the area were hunters. In the vicinity of Leopoldau, bronze weapons and jewelry provide evidence of subsequent settlement. Several of these items are now in the District Museum.

Early history
Around 500 BC, Celts entered the territory of present-day Floridsdorf, losing ground to the Romans as their empire expanded. The territory became a no-man's-land, or buffer zone, between the Romans and teutonic tribes, during a period when repeated battles were fought between the two peoples.

After the end of Roman rule, the territory attracted Lombards, Pannonian Avars, and Slavs. The Avars were later defeated by Charlemagne.

Middle Ages
The Magyars had conquered the Pannonian Basin (present-day Hungary) by the end of the ninth century, and launched a number of plundering raids both westward and southward. The westward raids were stopped only with the Magyar defeat at the Battle of Lechfeld of 955, which led to a new political order in Western Europe centered on the Holy Roman Empire. Around 1000 AD, the Babenberg ruled in the area that is now modern Vienna. In 1014 came the first written mention of what today is Floridsdorf Jedlesee, then called Outcinesse (Sea of Uz).

For a long time, the Danube could be crossed only by ferry. In the year 1500, the first bridge was built. At the site of today's Floridsdorfer Haupstrasse, near the water park, the first wooden bridge (Tabor Bridge) was built. Another bridge, the Kuhbrückl, crossed a small arm of the Danube. At the fork of the main road to Bohemia and Moravia, the new settlement of Floridsdorf came into being.

Modern period
Floridsdorf was first called "Am Spitz" and was later assigned to the Klosterneuburg Monastery. In 1786 Floridus Leeb, abbot of the monastery, transferred 26 properties to settler families. Through industrialization, Floridsdorf, originally an agricultural area, changed in a short time, so that on 8 May 1894 with the villages Donaufeld, Jedlesee and New Jedlersdorf, Floridsdorf was augmented to form a larger community. The steam tramway and the Northwest Railway have also contributed to industrialization. Today, a commemorative panel at Floridsdorf train station proclaims that on 23 November 1837 with the opening of the first section of the Emperor Ferdinand Northern Railway between Floridsdorf and Deutsch-Wagram, the age of the railways began in Austria.

From the middle of the 19th century, there were efforts to make Vienna reichsunmittelbar (self-governing under the Kaiser), separating it from the crown land of Austria at the Enns, Floridsdorf being envisaged as the future capital of Lower Austria.

By 1904, Floridsdorf was made up of the localities Jedlesee, Greater Jedlersdorf, Donaufeld, Leopoldau, Kagran, Hirschstetten, Stadlau, and Aspern. Then in 1910, Strebersdorf was also incorporated into Vienna. Through the establishment of the new district Donaustadt in 1938, Floridsdorf lost Kagran, Stadlau, Hirschstetten, Aspern and Lobau. During the Oil campaign of World War II, the Floridsdorf oil refinery and oil sidings were bombed by the Allies, in addition to a part of the southern Heinkel aviation firm's Heinkel-Süd military aircraft production facilities. In 1954, the borders of Lower Austria and Donaustadt were re-drawn and Stammersdorf incorporated.

Geography

Topography
North Floridsdorf is dominated by the southern foothills of Bisamberg.

The Danube marks Floridsdorf's southwestern border. Part of the New Danube and a section of the Danube Island fall within the district, while the wetlands immediately beyond form part of Döbling. Bridges spanning the Danube to Floridsdorf (listed by the Danube's direction of flow) include the Jedlesee bridge, the Vienna North Bridge, the Floridsdorf Bridge, the U6-Danube Bridge and the Brigittenauer Bridge. The northern section of the Old Danube flows through Floridsdorf. In 1992, the Marchfeld Canal, which crosses the district, was put into operation.

Sub-districts

Floridsdorf comprises seven formerly independent communities: Floridsdorf, Donaufeld, Greater Jedlersdorf, Jedlesee, Leopoldau, Stammersdorf, and Strebersdorf, plus portions of two others.

The eponymous Floridsdorf sub-district is also the smallest in area. The largest is Stammersdorf, to the north. Stammersdorf borders Strebersdorf and Großjedlersdorf, consisting of the two communities Großjedlersdorf I and II. To the east, on the border of the 22nd district, are Leopoldau and Donaufeld. Jedlesee in the west is composed of Jedlesee and Schwarze Lackenau. In addition to these full sub-districts, Floridsdorf also contains parts of Kagran and Kaisermühlen, the greater portions of which lie in the district of Donaustadt.

Census districts
Floridsdorf is also divided into 28 census districts. Although their names are identical or nearly identical to the corresponding sub-districts, the census districts of Donaufeld, Greater Jedlersdorf, Old Jedlesee, New Jedlesee, Leopoldau, Schwarzlackenau, Stammersdorf and Strebersdorf have distinct borders. Settlements and parcels of land have given their names to the census districts of Hirschfeld, Nordrandsiedlung, Großfeldsiedlung, Schottenfeld, Siemensstrasse, Jochberg, Donaufelder Gartnergebiet, Mühlschüttel, Bruckhaufen and Industriegelande Bahndreieck. The district of Autokader takes its name from the largest auto plant of the Habsburg monarchy (Austro-Fiat), while Gaswerk Leopoldau is named for the city gas works, opened in 1911. The remaining Floridsdorf census districts are named after streets: Stammersdorf-Brünner Straße, Leopoldauer Straße-Siemensstraße, Strebersdorf-Pragerstraße, Koloniestraße, Shuttleworthstraße, Floridsdorf-Brünnerstraße, Floridsdorf-Am Spitz und Donaufeld-Leopoldauer Straße.

Population

Population development
Today's 21st district includes that area of Floridsdorf which, in 1869, along with its villages, had only 12,022 inhabitants. With the city limits located near Vienna, the population increased rapidly and showed, up to the First World War, very high growth rates. In 1910, Floridsdorf already had 62,154 inhabitants, its population since 1869 having more than quintupled. Since Floridsdorf after the First World War had a comparatively low population density compared to other districts, the local population rose more gradually. Apart from a brief decline around the Second World War, Floridsdorf's population has grown continuously, but with a significant fall from the 1990s on. At the beginning of 2007, there were 137,186 inhabitants - the third largest population among the Vienna districts. In terms of population density, Floridsdorf ranks only in the bottom quarter of the 23 Vienna municipalities, with 3,086 inhabitants per km2.

Population structure
The population of Floridsdorf comprised, as of 2005, significantly more children, but also a slightly higher proportion of adults over 60, than the Vienna average. The number of children under 15 was 16.2% higher than for Vienna overall (14.6%). The proportion of the population aged 15 to 59 was 61.4% (Vienna: 63.4%), well below the mean, while the 20 to 34 age group showed a decrease. The proportion of inhabitants aged 60 or older was 22.5% (Vienna: 22.0%) slightly above the Vienna average. The gender distribution as of 2001 was 47.3% men and 52.7% women, the number of married people making up 43.0% compared to 41.2% in Vienna as a whole.

Language and nationality
The proportion of foreign residents in Floridsdorf as of 2006 was 11% (Vienna citywide: 19.1%),
ranking fourth among the Vienna municipalities. In line with the country as a whole, growth of the foreign population in 2001 was 7.8%. The highest proportion of foreign residents in the district as of 2005, at 2.3%, was represented by Serbian and Montenegran nationals. Another 1.2% were Turkish, 0.9% Polish and 0.6% German citizens. In 2001, a total of 15.4% of the district population was Austrian-born. Nearly 3.0% gave as their native language Serbian, 2.3% Turkish and 1.1% Croatian.

Religion
Floridsdorf has, with 53.9%, one of the highest populations of Roman Catholics in Vienna (Vienna citywide: 49.2%). There are 16 districts with Roman Catholic parishes, forming the City Deanery 21 (Archdiocese of Vienna). By contrast, the proportion of Muslims is 4.9% and Orthodox 3.0%. The proportion of Protestant residents stood at 4.4% in Vienna overall. 28.9% of the district's population as of 2001 professed no membership of a religious community, this being the highest such value within the Vienna municipality. A Further 4.9% of the population gave no religion or other confession.

Population centers
The District Office and the centre of Floridsdorf are located round Am Spitz, at the junction of Prager Straße (Prague Street) and Brünner Straße (Brno Street).

Parts of Floridsdorf were formerly villages, among which, for example, number Stammersdorf, Strebersdorf, and Leopoldau.
Because of these sub-districts' origin as villages, Floridsdorf is characteristically rural, with most Heuriger taverns selling homegrown wine.

Politics

Crest (coat of arms)
The six panels of the Floridsdorf coat of arms comprise the crests of the previously independent municipalities Floridsdorf, Greater Jedlersdorf, Jedlesee, Leopoldau, Stammer, and Strebersdorf.

These six divisions of the Floridsdorf crest may be described as follows:
 Floridsdorf: The coat of arms (center panel) shows a vase with three red flowers on green stalks between eight green leaves on a silver background.
 Leopoldau: The upper-left coat of arms is a brown-clad right arm, five golden ears of grain, on a blue background.
 Stammersdorf: The top-right coat of arms shows a deciduous tree and three coniferous trees on a green lawn, silver background.
 Jedlesee: The bottom-left coat of arms is the haloed image of the Virgin Mary of Loretto, dressed in gold, laced with pearls and precious stones, shown with the child Jesus and flanked by the red letters M and L, for "Maria Loretto" on a silver background.
 Strebersdorf: The bottom-right coat of arms shows a red-roofed guard tower with two round window openings and two red flags with a golden knob on the ridge in a green field with a blue background.
 Greater Jedlersdorf: The bottom-middle coat of arms shows two crossed white sacks on a red background.

Notable residents

 Anna Maria Erdődy
 Hannes Androsch
 Marko Arnautović
 Franz Jonas
 Andy Borg
 Karl Markovics
 Karl Nieschlag
 Hermann Nitsch
 Peter Pacult
 Peter Resetarits
 Erika Pluhar
 Toni Strobl
 Louis Black

Important buildings

 Many suburban settlements with gardens
 Numerous large settlements
 Großfeldsiedlung
 Nordrandsiedlung
 Siedlung Jedlesee
 Bruckhaufen
 Neu-Stammersdorf
 Schlingerhof
 Karl-Seitz-Hof
 Rosa-Weber-Hof
 Paul-Speiser-Hof
 Franz-Koch-Hof (ugs. Klein-Manhattan)
 Schools and other educational institutions
 Religious School of Education campus in Vienna Vienna - Strebersdorf (including practice and practice Volksschule Hauptschule - Cooperative Middle School)
 Vocational school for automotive technology, plumbing and Karosseure
 Special school for severely handicapped children
 Higher College for Tourism
 Higher College for Economic Occupations
 School of Animal Care Fund for the Promotion of Animal Training
 School brothers Strebersdorf
 Federal High School and Franklin Street Bundesrealgymnasium 21
 Federal and Federal School Gymnasium Franklin Straße 26
 Federal and Federal School Gymnasium Ödenburgerstraße
 Federal and Federal School Gymnasium "Bertha von Suttner", training ship
 Federal and Federal School Gymnasium "Ella Lingens Gymnasium" (formerly: Gerasdorf Street)
 University of Vienna - Business Center (BWZ)
 University of Veterinary Medicine Vienna
 Volkshochschule Floridsdorf
 Churches
 Church of the Order of Friars School Strebersdorf (Jean Baptiste de La Salle)
 Pfarrkirche Queen Mary (Strebersdorf)
 Donaufeld parish church
 Floridsdorfer St. Jakob
 Großjedlersdorfer Parish Church of St. Charles Borromeo (small pilgrimage church Maria Taferl)
 San Marco Polo Square
 Pastoral station of St. Michael
 Maria Loretto Church (Jedlesee)
 Pfarrkirche Gartenstadt
 Social Floridsdorf Medical Center - Hospital and Geriatric Center

Arts and Culture

Sights

 Beethoven Memorial and Erdödy Mansion, Jedlesee
 The Beethoven Way (Beethovenweg)
 Pfarrkirche Donaufeld (The bulky neo-early brick is the third highest church in Vienna and was, before the incorporation of Floridsdorf, planned to be the "Dom Niederösterreichs", the Cathedral of Lower Austria.)
 The Vienna Danube Island
 The Old Danube

Museums

The Museum of Local History, now known as the District Museum, founded in 1960 in the Floridsdorf Mautner Schlössl (Prague Street) building, is devoted principally to the emergence of the Danube landscape, the beginning of steam navigation, railway history, and the history of some of the more ancient places in the area. The Museum of Harness and Saddlery, Horseshoes and Veterinary Orthopedics, closed in 2014, but pertaining to everything equine, housed a collection of bone specimens, saddles, horse and beef dishes and an exhibit on the development of horseshoeing from the Romans to the present day. The Vienna Fisheries Museum presents its visitors with information on local fishing through the ages, featuring an exhibition of rare specimens of native fish, aquariums, ancient writings and exhibits, fishing gear and fish-eating animals. In Jedlesee, at the former estate of Countess Anna Maria Erdődy, a memorial to Ludwig van Beethoven was established.

Choirs
The choral group Harmony (exact name: Floridsdorfer Chorvereinigung "Harmony 1865"; founded: 1865) is a mixed choir, consisting of an average of 40 members. It gives regular performances, for example during Festival-week and Christmas, always with a program appropriate to the season. The choir makes occasional concert tours: to Kraków most recently, also to Rome and Tuscany.

Twin municipalities
  Angyalföld
  Katsushika

Sports clubs
 Floridsdorfer AC
Austrian gymnastics and sports Union Donaufeld
 Leopoldau Sports Union

See also
Lokomotivfabrik Floridsdorf - locomotive works in Floridsdorf

References

Sources
 "Wien - 21. Bezirk/Floridsdorf", Wien.gv.at, 2008, webpage (15 subpages): Wien.gv.at-floridsdorf.
 Felix Czeike: Wiener Bezirkskulturführer: XXI. Floridsdorf ("Vienna District Cultural Leader: XXI. Floridsdorf"). Jugend and Volk, Vienna 1979, .
 Raimund Hinkel, Kurt Landsmann, Robert Vrtala: Floridsdorf von A-Z. Der 21. Bezirk in 1.000 Stichworten ("Floridsdorf from A-Z: the 21st District in 1,000 words"). Brandstätter, Vienna 1997, .
 Kurt Landsmann: Floridsdorf 1945: das Kriegsende. Ein Beitrag zur Zeitgeschichte ("Floridsdorf 1945: The War's End: A View of Time History"). Brandstätter Verlag, Vienna 1995, .
 Carola Leitner (Hg.): Floridsdorf: Wiens 21. Bezirk in alten Fotografien ("Floridsdorf: Vienna's 21st District in Old Photographs"). Ueberreuter, Vienna 2006, .
 Peter Schubert: Jugendstil & Co: Hausschmuck in Floridsdorf 1880–1930 ("Houses in Floridsdorf 1880–1930"). Mayer, Klosterneuburg 2001, .

External links
 District community Floridsdorf 
 Official Website on Archive.org 
 District Museum of Floridsdorf 
 SCN official Website (Shopping Center Nord) 

 
Districts of Vienna